Terry Hyman (December 7, 1951 – June 27, 2008) was an American politician who served in the Oklahoma House of Representatives from the 49th district from 2004 to 2008.

He died in a tractor accident on June 27, 2008, in Leon, Oklahoma at age 56.

References

1951 births
2008 deaths
Democratic Party members of the Oklahoma House of Representatives
20th-century American politicians